Technicolor for Industrial Films (1949) is a sponsored film about how Technicolor can be used in industrial films. The film features footage of various objects in Technicolor, showing how it can be used in filmmaking. One scene shows a bunch of everyday goods, first being shown in black-and-white, then in Technicolor.

The film is notable because it's an ephemeral film about ephemeral films, and very few ephemeral films were made about ephemeral films at the time this film was made. The film is now in the public domain.

Technicolor for Industrial Films was preserved by the Academy Film Archive in 1995.

See also
Technicolor
Sponsored film
Advertising

References

Frances Guerin, "Weltwunder der Kinematographie: Film History auf DVD", Vol. 1 (review). The Moving Image, Volume 3, Number 2, Fall 2003, pp. 123-126
Christopher P. Jacobs, "2006 Cinesation Review - More movies, classic to obscure", High Plains Reader

External links
 Technicolor for Industrial Films free legal download at Internet Archive
 Technicolor for Industrial Films at IMDB

1949 films
American independent films
Sponsored films
Promotional films
1949 documentary films
American documentary films
1940s American films